Piotr Wlazło (born 3 June 1989) is a Polish professional footballer who plays as a midfielder for Stal Mielec.

References

External links
 
 

1989 births
People from Radom
Sportspeople from Masovian Voivodeship
Living people
Polish footballers
Association football midfielders
Widzew Łódź players
Radomiak Radom players
Wisła Płock players
Jagiellonia Białystok players
Bruk-Bet Termalica Nieciecza players
Stal Mielec players
Ekstraklasa players
I liga players
II liga players